Louis William Wain (5 August 1860 – 4 July 1939) was an English artist best known for his drawings, which consistently featured anthropomorphized large-eyed cats and kittens. Later in life, he was confined to mental institutions and struggled with mental illness.

Life

Early life

Wain was born on 5 August 1860 in Clerkenwell in London. His father, William Matthew Wain (1825–1880), was a textile trader and embroiderer; his mother, Julie Felicite Boiteux (1833–1910), was French. He was the first of six children and the only male child. None of his five sisters—Caroline E. M. (1862–1917), Josephine F. M. (1864–1939), Marie L. (1867–1913), Claire M. (1868–1945), and Felicie J. (1871–1940)—ever married. At 34 years old, his sister Marie was declared insane. She was admitted to an asylum in 1901, where she died in 1913. The remaining sisters lived with their mother for the duration of her life.

Wain was born with a cleft lip; a doctor told his parents that he should not be sent to school or taught until he was ten. As a youth, he was often truant from school and spent much of his childhood wandering around London. He subsequently studied at the West London School of Art and was eventually a teacher there for a short period. At the age of 20, he was left to support his mother and his five sisters after his father's death in 1880. He moved out from home and rented a furnished room when in 1881 he had his first drawing—Bullfinches on Laurel Bushes—published in the Illustrated Sporting and Dramatic News.

Artistic career

Wain soon quit his teaching position to become a freelance artist. In this role, he achieved great success. He specialized in drawing animals and country scenes, and worked for several journals including the Illustrated Sporting and Dramatic News, where he stayed for four years; and The Illustrated London News, where he began in 1886. Through the 1880s, his work included detailed illustrations of English country houses and estates, and livestock he was commissioned to draw at agricultural shows. His work at this time included a wide variety of animals, and he maintained his ability to draw creatures of all kinds throughout his lifetime. At one point, he hoped to make a living by drawing dog portraits.

At 23, Wain married his sisters' governess, Emily Richardson, who was ten years his senior (which was considered scandalous at the time) and moved with her to Hampstead in north London. She soon began to suffer from breast cancer and died three years later. Prior to her death, Wain discovered the subject that would define his career. During her illness, Emily was comforted by their pet cat Peter, a stray black-and-white kitten whom they rescued when they heard him meowing in the rain one night. Wain  drew extensive sketches of Peter, which Emily encouraged him to have published. He later wrote of Peter, "To him, properly, belongs the foundation of my career, the developments of my initial efforts, and the establishing of my work." Peter can be recognized in many of Wain's early published works.

In 1886, Wain's first drawing of anthropomorphized cats, A Kitten's Christmas Party, was published in the Christmas issue of the Illustrated London News. The magazine editor, Sir William Ingram, commissioned Wain to create this work, which probably represented the peak of his fame. It depicted 150 cats, many of which resembled Peter, engaged in activities such as sending invitations, holding a ball, playing games, and making speeches. It spread across eleven panels. The cats remain on all fours, unclothed, and without the variety of human-like expression which would characterize Wain's later work. 

Shortly after the success of A Kitten’s Christmas Party, Emily died on January 2, 1887. After her death, Wain began to suffer from depression and cats soon became an obsession for him. As a result, the style in which he depicted them started to change. Emily’s death and future tragic events in his life—the death of his cat Peter and one of his sisters—most likely contributed to his mental breakdown. 

From 1906 to 1916, the widowed Louis Wain and his extended family lived in Westgate-on-Sea, Kent, as a tenant of his patron, Sir William Ingram. A blue plaque at Westgate Bay Avenue marks his time there.

In subsequent years, his cats began to walk upright, smile broadly and use other exaggerated facial expressions, and wear sophisticated, contemporary clothing. He illustrated cats playing musical instruments, serving tea, playing cards, fishing, smoking, and enjoying nights at the opera. Such anthropomorphic portrayals of animals were popular in Victorian England and were often found in prints, on greeting cards and in satirical illustrations such as those of John Tenniel.

Over the next 30 years, Wain was a prolific artist. He produced as many as several hundred drawings a year, and he illustrated about 100 children's books. His work appeared in papers, journals and magazines, including the Louis Wain Annual, which ran from 1901 to 1915. His work was also reproduced on picture postcards, now highly valued collectors' items. In 1898 and 1911 he was chairman of the National Cat Club.

Wain's illustrations often parody human behaviour, satirizing fads and fashions of the day. He wrote, "I take a sketch-book to a restaurant, or other public places, and draw the people in their different positions as cats, getting as near to their human characteristics as possible. This gives me doubly nature, and these studies I think [to be] my best humorous work."

Wain was involved with several animal charities, including the Governing Council of Our Dumb Friends League, the Society for the Protection of Cats, and the Anti-Vivisection Society. As mentioned earlier, he was active in the National Cat Club, and served as its president and chairman. He felt that he helped "to wipe out the contempt in which the cat has been held" in England.

Despite his popularity, Wain suffered financial difficulty throughout his life. He remained responsible for supporting his mother and sisters and had little business sense. He was modest, naive, easily exploited, and ill-equipped for bargaining in the world of publishing. He often sold his drawings outright, retaining no rights over their reproduction. He was easily misled and found himself duped by the promise of a new invention or other money-making schemes.

He travelled to New York in 1907, where he drew some comic strips, such as Cats About Town and Grimalkin, for newspapers owned by the Hearst Corporation. His work was widely admired, although his critical attitude towards the city made him the subject of sniping in the press. He returned home with even less money, due to his imprudent investment in a new type of oil lamp.

Circa 1914, Wain created a number of ceramic pieces produced by Amphora Ceramics. Dubbed the "futurist cat", the pieces were of cats and dogs in angular shapes and with geometrical markings. They are considered to be in the Cubist art style.

Later life

It must be noted that Wain's presumed schizophrenia should not be attributed to toxoplasmosis, a disease precipitated by the parasite Toxoplasma gondii, which is excreted by cats in their faeces. The old theory that toxoplasmosis can trigger schizophrenia, which can be traced back as early as the mid-20th century, has been widely contested, for there is no solid evidence that supports the idea that toxoplasmosis may affect people's behaviour; and although research on the field continues, currently the connection between schizophrenia and toxoplasmosis seems to be a myth rather than a fact. It must also be noted that  Wain was not the only person in his family afflicted by a  mental  disorder.

In 1924, when his sisters could no longer cope with his erratic, and sometimes violent behaviour, Wain was committed to a pauper ward at the Springfield Mental Hospital in Tooting. When Wain was discovered there a year later, his circumstances were widely publicized, leading to appeals from such figures as H. G. Wells, and the personal intervention of Prime Minister Stanley Baldwin. Wain was transferred to the Bethlem Royal Hospital in Southwark, and again, in 1930, he was transferred to Napsbury Hospital near St Albans in Hertfordshire, north of London. Napsbury was relatively pleasant, with a garden and colony of cats, and he spent his final years there in peace. While he became more and more deluded, his erratic mood swings subsided, and he continued drawing for pleasure. His work from this period is marked by bright colours, flowers, and intricate and abstract patterns, though his primary subject of cats remained the same.

Death
Wain died on 4 July 1939 at Napsbury Mental Health Hospital, St Albans, Hertfordshire, England. He is buried in his father's grave at St. Mary's Roman Catholic Cemetery, Kensal Green, London.

Legacy

Medical controversy
Writing in 2001, Michael Fitzgerald disputes the claim that Wain was schizophrenic, saying that he more likely had Autism Spectrum Disorder (ASD). He indicates that while Wain's art became more abstract as he grew older, his technique and skill as a painter did not diminish, as one would expect with schizophrenia. He observes that elements of visual agnosia—the inability to recognize certain objects, even though a person can recall them if asked—are demonstrated in his painting. If Wain did have visual agnosia, it might have manifested itself as extreme attention to detail.

Series of his paintings have commonly been used as examples in psychology textbooks to putatively show the change in his style as his psychological condition deteriorated. However, given that Wain did not date his works, it is not known if these works were created in the order presented in textbooks, which typically show more florid, abstract pictures as appearing later, indicative of Wain's mental state. Rodney Dale, author of Louis Wain: The Man Who Drew Cats, has criticized this characterization, and argued: "Wain experimented with patterns and cats, and even quite late in life was still producing conventional cat pictures, perhaps 10 years after his [supposedly] 'later' productions which are patterns rather than cats."

In 2012, Kevin Van Eeckelen proposed in an article about psychotic patterns that evidence of deterioration was found in Louis Wain's earlier (narrative) work, for instance in the Louis Wain Kitten Book (1903). This analysis is based on the mimetic (girardian) view of psychosis, which focuses on the continuity between 'normality' and 'madness'.

In December 2012, psychiatrist David O’Flynn, at a gallery talk at an exhibition of "Kaleidoscopic Cats" at the Bethlem Royal Hospital Archives & Museum, proposed viewing the series as the creation of two men—"Louis Wain, who created them, and Walter Maclay (1902–1964), the psychiatrist who organised them into a series."

O'Flynn suggested Maclay saw in the series a proof of his own ideas, partly based on his 1930s experiments with art and mescaline-induced psychosis. Maclay concluded that the creative ability of people with schizophrenia deteriorated. O'Flynn says that, based on examination of the work of outsider artists, the link between schizophrenia and the deterioration of artwork doesn't hold true. Looking at Wain's late work, O'Flynn sees greater experimentation and use of colour, not a deterioration. Despite the series being known to be assembled, and the pictures not dated since the 1960s, "their representation of something that doesn't exist, namely psychotic deterioration, has been surprisingly robust". The series has become "the Mona Lisa of asylum art".

Recognition
H. G. Wells said of Wain, "He made the cat his own. He invented a cat style, a cat society, a whole cat world. British cats that do not look and live like Louis Wain cats are ashamed of themselves."

His work is now collectable, but forgeries are common.

Although Wain's books are all in the public domain, to date none have been reprinted other than Father Tuck's Struwwelpeter. A number of collections of his artwork, however, have been released.

Relevance to later psychedelia
Wain's later work has been identified as an important precursor to 1960s psychedelic art. The 1960s saw renewed interest in Wain's psychedelic work, and psychedelia fans of the time "marveled at how Wain could produce these [psychedelic] images without taking any sort of substances."

Biographical film

Wain's life is the subject of The Electrical Life of Louis Wain, a 2021 Amazon Studios production starring Benedict Cumberbatch as Wain and Claire Foy as his wife Emily Richardson.

Bibliography
All Sorts of Comical Cats. Verses by Clifton Bingham London: Ernest Nister
Fun at the Zoo with Verses By Clifton Bingham
Funny Favourites. Forty-five Pen-and-Ink Drawings by Louis Wain. London. Ernest Nister.
 Madame Tabby's Establishment (1886)
 Our Farm: The Trouble of Successes Thereof (1888)
 Dreams by French Firesides (1890)
 Peter, A Cat O'One Tail: His Life and Adventures (1892)
 Old Rabbit the Voodoo and Other Sorcerers (1893)
 Fun and Frolic, with verses by Clifton Bingham, London: Ernest Nister (1900).
 The Dandy Lion (1901) 
 Cats (1902)
 Pa Cats, Ma Cats and their kittens (1903)
 The Louis Wain Kitten Book (1903)
 Claws and Paws (1904)
 Mixed Pickles by Louis Wain (c. 1905)
 Cat's Cradle (1908)
 Pantomime Pussies (c. 1908)
 Louis Wain's Cat Painting Book (c.1910)
 Louis Wain's Cats and Dogs (c. 1910)
 The Louis Wain Nursery Book (c. 1910)
 Louis Wain's Cat Mascot (postcard coloring book, c.1910)
 Father Tuck's Struwwelpeter As Seen by Louis Wain, Told in Merry Rhymes by Norman Gale (c.1910), second Edition Fidgety Phil and Other Tales (c. 1925)
 The Happy Family (c. 1914)
 Daddy Cat (1915)
 Little Red Riding Hood and Other Tales (1919)
 Music in Pussytown (c. 1920)
 Somebody's Pussies (1925)
 The Boy who Shares My Name (1926)

References

Sources

External links 

 Original Louis Wain artwork
 Extended Louis Wain Biography
 Louis Wain's Kitten Book
  archived at Ghostarchive.org on 3 May 2022
 Other pictures
 Article on Wain's postcards on Collector Cafe
 Cats Painted in the Progression of Psychosis of Louis Wain
 
 
 

1860 births
1939 deaths
19th-century English painters
20th-century English painters
Burials at St Mary's Catholic Cemetery, Kensal Green
Cat artists
English cartoonists
English male sculptors
English male painters
English people of French descent
Outsider artists
People with schizophrenia
Postcard artists
Psychedelic artists
20th-century English male artists
19th-century English male artists